Christopher Mark Kiwomya (born 2 December 1969) is an English football manager and former professional footballer, who is the manager of British Virgin Islands national football team.

He played as a forward from 1987 until 2002 notably in the Premier League for Ipswich Town and Arsenal. He also played in the Football League for Queens Park Rangers, as well as playing abroad for Le Havre, Selangor and AaB. He also played for the England U21 team. After retiring as a player, he went on to gain his UEFA Pro Licence from the English FA and has coached and managed at clubs including Arsenal Academy and Ipswich. In 2013 he had a spell as manager of Notts County.

Playing career
Kiwomya was born in Huddersfield. He was at Ipswich Town as a trainee and played over 250 games, and was the club's top scorer in the 1991–92 season in which Ipswich were promoted from the old Second Division. In total he scored 62 goals for the East Anglian club, working in partnership with Jason Dozzell. Whilst at Ipswich he played for England U21s, preventing him playing for the Uganda national team, which he qualified for through his parentage.

He signed for Arsenal in a £1.25million deal in January 1995, as one of George Graham's last signings for the club, along with John Hartson. He made his debut against Everton on 14 January 1995 and was rarely out of the side that campaign. Kiwomya scored his first goal for Arsenal in the 1–0 win over Nottingham Forest in February 1995. He made his European debut against Auxerre, on 2 March 1995 and was an unused substitute in the European Cup Winner's Cup Final match between Arsenal and Real Zaragoza. Kiwomya scored three goals in 17 appearances in 1994–95. Graham had been sacked in February for a highly publicised "bungs" incident, and Stewart Houston had remained in charge until the appointment of Bruce Rioch after the end of the season. The acquisition of Dennis Bergkamp, as well as competition from the likes of Ian Wright and Hartson, left Kiwomya down the pecking order.

He spent 1996–97 on loan at Le Havre AC of France, making seven appearances. He also spent time with Selangor FA in the Malaysian league scoring the winning goal in the Malaysia Cup Final in December 1997. In August 1998, more than three years after his last game for Arsenal, he finally left Highbury on a free transfer and signed for QPR in Division One. He played for QPR for three seasons, scoring 30 times in almost 100 appearances before joining AaB Aalborg in Denmark in 2001, on a free transfer, but cancelled his contract by mutual consent due to injury and subsequently called time on his professional football career following a trial with Grimsby Town in early 2002 in which he failed to earn a contract.

Coaching career
Kiwomya started his coaching career with Arsenal Academy, coaching the U14 team in the 2007–08 season. In July 2008 he was appointed as reserve team development coach at Ipswich Town. by then manager, Jim Magilton. When Roy Keane became manager, he became youth team manager, managing the U18s, but then was promoted by Keane for the 2010–11 season back into the Reserve Team role. His Reserve Team won the Football Combination East Division in the 2010–11 season. He helped to develop youth players including Jordan Rhodes, who was sold on to Huddersfield  and Connor Wickham, who was later sold to Sunderland  He left the position in May 2011.

Managerial career
Kiwomya was appointed to set up a development squad at Notts County in February 2012 under manager Keith Curle. He was appointed caretaker manager of Notts County on 3 February 2013 following the sacking of Keith Curle. On 27 March 2013, having lost only one of ten games, Kiwomya was appointed full-time manager on a three-year deal. He led the team to 12th position in League 1 at the end of the 2012–13 season.

In the 2013–14 season, Kiwomya wanted to make Notts County a young team with technically-gifted players. In August 2013, he signed Callum McGregor on a five-month loan from Celtic and he scored on his debut on 7 August 2013 in a 3–2 win in the League Cup against Fleetwood Town. Kiwomya's next signing was Jack Grealish on 13 September 2013 from Aston Villa on a youth loan. Grealish made his debut the next day against MK Dons. Kiwomya's team drew with Liverpool F.C. away from home in the League Cup. On 27 October 2013, Kiwomya left Notts County by mutual consent. In 2021 Kiwomya was appointed head coach of the British Virgin Islands national team.

Personal life
His nephew is Alex Kiwomya, the son of his brother Andy Kiwomya.

Managerial statistics

Honours
Ipswich Town
Football League Second Division: 1991–92

Individual
Ipswich Town Hall of Fame: Inducted 2017

References

External links

AaB profile
 Chris Kiwomya Interview

1969 births
Footballers from Huddersfield
Living people
English footballers
Association football forwards
Ipswich Town F.C. players
Arsenal F.C. players
Queens Park Rangers F.C. players
Le Havre AC players
Grimsby Town F.C. players
Expatriate footballers in France
AaB Fodbold players
Expatriate men's footballers in Denmark
Premier League players
Expatriate footballers in Malaysia
English people of Ugandan descent
Black British sportsmen
Selangor FA players
Arsenal F.C. non-playing staff
British Virgin Islands national football team managers
Ipswich Town F.C. non-playing staff
Notts County F.C. non-playing staff
Notts County F.C. managers
English expatriate footballers
English football managers
English expatriate sportspeople in France
English expatriate sportspeople in Denmark
English expatriate sportspeople in Malaysia
Association football coaches